Herminio "Butch" dela Cruz Bautista (May 20, 1934 – February 12, 2017) was a Filipino comedian-director and politician, who made his film debut in the 1956 film Lo' Waist Gang along with Berting Labra, Zaldy Zschornack and others, which was topbilled by Fernando Poe Jr.

Personal life
Bautista has 3 children - two sons, Herbert (who is also a comedian) and Hero and a daughter, Harlene.

Death
Bautista died on February 12, 2017, at the age of 82.

Filmography

As actor

As director

References

External links

1934 births
2017 deaths
Filipino male film actors
Members of Iglesia ni Cristo
Filipino film directors
Quezon City Council members